Şemseddin Ahmed (1469–1534), better known by his pen name Ibn Kemal or Kemalpaşazâde ("son of Kemal Pasha"), was an Ottoman historian, Shaykh al-Islām, jurist and poet.

He was born into a distinguished military family in Edirne and as a young man he served in the army and later studied at various madrasas and became the Kadı of Edirne in 1515. He had Iranian roots on his mother's side. He became a highly respected scholar and was commissioned by the Ottoman ruler Bayezid II to write an Ottoman history (Tevārīh-i Āl-i Osmān, "The Chronicles of the House of Osman"). During the reign of Selim the Resolute, in 1516, he was appointed as military judge of Anatolia and accompanied the Ottoman army to Egypt. During the reign of Suleiman the Magnificent he was appointed as the Shaykh al-Islām, i.e. supreme head of the ulama, a post which he held until his death.

Kemalpaşazâde was a crucially important figure in the codification of the Hanafi school of thought in its Ottoman iteration.

Works
He "authored around 200 works in Turkish, Persian, and Arabic. His works include commentaries on the Qur'an, treatises on hadith, Islamic law, philosophy and theology (kalam), logic, Sufism, ethics, history, several books on Arabic and Persian grammar, literature, and a small diwan of poetry."

His most famous history work is the Tevārīh-i Āl-i Osmān "The Chronicles of the House of Osman", a history of the Ottoman Empire which provides the most original and important source material now extant on the reigns during which he himself lived. 

Although best known as a historian, Kemalpaşazâde was also a great scholar and a talented poet. He wrote numerous scholarly commentaries on the Quran, treatises on jurisprudence and Muslim theology and philosophy, and during his stay in Egypt he translated the works of the Egyptian historian ibn Taghribirdi from Arabic. He also wrote in Arabic, a philological work entitled Daqāʿiq al-Haqāʿiq "The Subtleties of Verities". His best poetical works include the Nigaristan "The Picture Gallery", written in Persian and modeled upon the Būstān and the Golestān of Saadi Shirazi; a poem, "Yusuf ü Züleyha", in rhymed couplets, retelling the story of Joseph and Potiphar's wife; and Divān "Collected Poems", consisting mainly of lyrics.

In philosophy and theology, he was a Maturidi theologian-philosopher who followed some opinions of ibn Arabi and anticipated some theories of Mulla Sadra. Kemalpaşazâde also wrote a famous history of the Hanafi school of fiqh entitled Risāla fī Ṭabaqāt al-Mujtahidīn "The Treatise regarding Biographies of Jurists".

Notes

Bibliography
 Online
 Encyclopædia Britannica

Hanafis
Maturidis
15th-century Muslim theologians
16th-century Persian-language writers
Arabic-language writers from the Ottoman Empire
People from Edirne
Sheikh-ul-Islams of the Ottoman Empire
Turkish Sunni Muslim scholars of Islam
16th-century historians from the Ottoman Empire
15th-century historians from the Ottoman Empire
1468 births
1536 deaths
Supporters of Ibn Arabi
People from the Ottoman Empire of Iranian descent
16th-century Muslim theologians
Islamic scholars from the Ottoman Empire
Shaykh al-Islāms
Writers of Iranian descent